Theo Martens (born 14 September 1990) is a Dutch footballer who plays as a midfielder for VV Dongen in the Derde Divisie.

In 2012, Martens played for SC Veendam in the Eerste Divisie, which, however, went bankrupt in early 2013. In the 2013–14 season he played in Belgium for Witgoor Dessel in the Fourth Division C. Since 2014, he has played for Achilles Veen. On 6 January 2021, the club announced that Martens would leave at the end of the season after seven seasons. He subsequently signed with VV Dongen.

References

External links
 

1990 births
Living people
Dutch footballers
Eerste Divisie players
Willem II (football club) players
Footballers from Tilburg
Association football midfielders
FC Den Bosch players
SC Veendam players
Vierde Divisie players
VV Dongen players
Achilles Veen players